Otto Nagel (27 September 1894 – 12 July 1967) was a German painter, graphic designer and long-time head of the Berlin Academy of Arts who was one of the most prolific artists of East Germany.

Life 
Born at Berlin-Wedding, Nagel was the son of a carpenter and social democrat. After completing his basic schooling he briefly entered into an apprenticeship with a stained glass painter, but soon broke this off. In 1912 he joined the Social Democratic Party. He was a conscientious objector during the First World War, and was imprisoned for refusing to serve. After the war he first began to paint after being exposed to the work of August Macke. He gradually became a staunch communist, joining the Communist Party of Germany in 1920. Throughout the 1920s he was very active in the Berlin art scene, becoming acquainted with Käthe Kollwitz, El Lissitzky, and many other notables. He became secretary of the Workers International Relief, and in 1922 he co-founded the "Artist's Relief" division thereof with Erwin Piscator. In 1924, Nagel joined the Red Group in Berlin and

 accompanied an exhibition of young artists to the Soviet Union. He was close friends with Heinrich Zille and Käthe Kollwitz, whose estate he later handled. Through Nagel, numerous writings about her work have been published. In 1925 he married the Russian singer-actress Valentina ("Walli") Nikitina.  From 1928 to 1931, he joined the November Group and was a co-founder of the Association of Revolutionary Visual Artists. From 1928 to 1932, he was publisher and editor-in-chief of the satirical magazine Eulenspiegel.

In 1933, Nagel was elected chairman of the National Association of Visual Artists of Germany, but the election was annulled by the Nazis the next day. When the Nazis seized power, much of Nagel's work was declared degenerate. He was forbidden to paint, and from 1936 to 1937 he was incarcerated in various Nazi concentration camps, including Sachsenhausen.

After the end of the Second World War, Nagel lived and worked in Bergholz-Rehbrücke in Potsdam, Brandenburg, later part of East Germany. In 1945, he was one of the co-founders of the Cultural Association of the GDR. In 1952, he moved to Berlin-Biesdorf. From 1956 to 1962, he was the president of the DDR Academy of Arts, Berlin.  He died at Berlin-Biesdorf in 1967 and was interred in the Zentralfriedhof Friedrichsfelde. In 1970, he was posthumously made an honorary citizen of Berlin.

There is a secondary school named for Nagel in Berlin-Biesdorf.

Sources 
 Erhard Frommhold: Otto Nagel. Zeit, Leben, Werk, Berlin, 1974
 Wolfgang Hütt: Welt der Kunst – Otto Nagel, Henschelverlag. Kunst und Gesellschaft, Berlin, 1984
 Sepp Kern. "Nagel, Otto." In Grove Art Online. Oxford Art Online, (accessed 31 December 2011; subscription required).
 Heinz Lüdecke: Künstler der Gegenwart 1 – Otto Nagel, VEB Verlag der Kunst, Dresden, 1959
 Gerhard Pommeranz-Liedtke: Otto Nagel und Berlin, VEB Verlag der Kunst, Dresden, 1964

References

External links 
 
 
 Entry for Otto Nagel in the Union List of Artist Names

1894 births
1967 deaths
People from Mitte
Social Democratic Party of Germany politicians
Communist Party of Germany members
Socialist Unity Party of Germany politicians
Members of the Provisional Volkskammer
Members of the 1st Volkskammer
Cultural Association of the GDR members
East German artists
20th-century German painters
20th-century German male artists
German male painters
Sachsenhausen concentration camp survivors
Recipients of the National Prize of East Germany
Recipients of the Patriotic Order of Merit in gold
Artists from Berlin